This page are listed the results of all of the Vitória Carnival on year 2016

Grupo Especial

Grupo A

References 

Vitoria